Eino Alfred Purje (21 February 1900 – 2 September 1984) was a middle-distance runner from Finland, who won the bronze medal in the 1500 metres at the 1928 Summer Olympics. He also reached the finals of the 5000 m race in 1928 and 1500 m event in 1932.

References

1900 births
1984 deaths
People from Kotka
People from Viipuri Province (Grand Duchy of Finland)
Finnish male middle-distance runners
Olympic athletes of Finland
Olympic bronze medalists for Finland
Athletes (track and field) at the 1928 Summer Olympics
Athletes (track and field) at the 1932 Summer Olympics
Medalists at the 1928 Summer Olympics
Olympic bronze medalists in athletics (track and field)
Sportspeople from Kymenlaakso